Roger W. Hendrix (July 7, 1943 – August 15, 2017) was an American biologist, focusing in bacteriophage biology, and a Distinguished Professor at University of Pittsburgh. He studied biology at the California Institute of Technology and went on to obtain his Ph.D. from Harvard University under the supervision of James Watson, the co-discoverer of the structure of DNA. In 2009, he received the NAS Award for Scientific Reviewing.

He died on August 15, 2017.

External links 
Publications by Roger Hendrix in PubMed.

References

1943 births
2017 deaths
University of Pittsburgh faculty
American biologists
Harvard University alumni
California Institute of Technology alumni